Dangers of the Engagement Period is a 1930 German silent comedy film directed by Fred Sauer and starring Marlene Dietrich, Willi Forst, and Lotte Lorring. It is also known by the alternative title of Nights of Love.

The film's sets were designed by the art director Max Heilbronner. It was shot at the Staaken Studios in Berlin and on location in Scheveningen in the Netherlands. Shot as a silent during September and October 1929, it was not released until February the following year by which time sound films were increasingly dominant. It was given a favourable review by Lotte Eisner in the Film-Kurier.

While making the film Dietrich was also appearing in a stage show alongside Hans Albers. It was her final film before her breakthrough role in The Blue Angel, which made her an international star and led to her departure for Hollywood.

Synopsis
During a railway journey, Baron van Geldern meets an attractive young woman Evelyne in the same carriage. After the train is derailed, they spend a night together at a hotel, and he falls in love with her. Complications ensue when he discovers that she is engaged to his American friend.

Cast

In popular culture 
This article was the topic of conversation in the fourth episode of series two of the web series "Two Of These People Are Lying" hosted by The Technical Difficulties.

References

Bibliography

External links

1930 films
Films of the Weimar Republic
Films directed by Fred Sauer
German silent feature films
German black-and-white films
1930 comedy films
German comedy films
Silent comedy films
1930s German films
Films shot at Staaken Studios